Relocated is the seventh studio album from German synthpop group Camouflage, released on August 28, 2006 by SPV Records. Three singles were released from the record: "Motif Sky", "Something Wrong", and "The Pleasure Remains".

Reviews 
Release Magazine gave the album a mostly positive review, stating "...slightly more pop tuned, but still holds all the Camouflage trademark elements. Personal vocal performances, gloom and pop all in one. The single "Motif Sky" is one of the tracks that have blossomed through repeated listening, as have "We Are Lovers" and my current favourite "Dreaming". Except for the exceptionally dreary "How Do You Feel?", "Relocated" is a solid effort, maybe lacking somewhat in raw hit power".

Track listing 
All songs written by Camouflage.

Credits
Arranged By – Heiko Maile, Marcus Meyn, Oliver Kreyssig
Engineer [Additional Engineering] – Ronda Ray (alias Heiko Maile) 
Mastered By – Bo Kondren 
Mixed By – Jochen Schmalbach 
Producer – Heiko Maile 
Recorded By – Ronda Ray (alias Heiko Maile) 
Recorded By [Additional Recordings] – Christian Cyfus, Volker Hinkel 
Songwriter – Heiko Maile, Marcus Meyn, Oliver Kreyssig

℗ 2006 Synthetic Symphony
© 2006 Synthetic Symphony a division of SPV GmbH

References

External links
Official discography

2006 albums
Camouflage (band) albums